Conquest of Ha'il also referred as the Second Saudi–Rashidi War, was engaged by the Saudi forces, which received British military assistance and its ally Ikhwan tribesmen upon the Emirate of Jabal Shammar, under the last Rashidi ruler. On November 2, 1921, the last Al Rashid dynasty rulers surrendered Jabal Shammar to the Saudi forces.

Naming
The Emirate of Jabal Shammar had its capital in the city of Ha'il, and was also known as the "Emirate of Ha'il".

See also
List of modern conflicts in the Middle East

References

History of Saudi Arabia
1921 in Saudi Arabia
Ha'il
Ha'il